The 2023 Indonesia Masters (officially known as the Daihatsu Indonesia Masters 2023 for sponsorship reasons) was a badminton tournament that took place at the Istora Gelora Bung Karno, Jakarta, Indonesia, from 24 to 29 January 2023 and had a total prize of US$420,000.

Tournament
The 2023 Indonesia Masters was the third tournament of the 2023 BWF World Tour and was part of the Indonesia Masters championships, which had been held since 2010. This tournament was organized by the Badminton Association of Indonesia with sanction from the BWF.

Venue
This international tournament was held at the Istora Gelora Bung Karno in Jakarta, Indonesia.

Point distribution
Below is the point distribution table for each phase of the tournament based on the BWF points system for the BWF World Tour Super 500 event.

Prize pool
The total prize money was US$420,000 with the distribution of the prize money in accordance with BWF regulations.

Men's singles

Seeds

 Viktor Axelsen (withdrew)
 Lee Zii Jia (second round)
 Loh Kean Yew (second round)
 Jonatan Christie (champion)
 Anthony Sinisuka Ginting (second round)
 Chou Tien-chen (first round)
 Lakshya Sen (quarter-finals)
 Prannoy H. S. (first round)

Finals

Top half

Section 1

Section 2

Bottom half

Section 3

Section 4

Women's singles

Seeds

 Akane Yamaguchi (withdrew)
 Chen Yufei (withdrew)
 An Se-young (champion)
 He Bingjiao (second round)
 Ratchanok Intanon (quarter-finals)
 Wang Zhiyi (semi-finals)
 Carolina Marín (final)
 Han Yue (semi-finals)

Finals

Top half

Section 1

Section 2

Bottom half

Section 3

Section 4

Men's doubles

Seeds

 Fajar Alfian / Muhammad Rian Ardianto (quarter-finals)
 Takuro Hoki / Yugo Kobayashi (semi-finals)
 Mohammad Ahsan / Hendra Setiawan (second round)
 Aaron Chia / Soh Wooi Yik (quarter-finals)
 Liu Yuchen / Ou Xuanyi (semi-finals)
 Kim Astrup / Anders Skaarup Rasmussen (first round)
 Goh Sze Fei / Nur Izzuddin (withdrew)
 Choi Sol-gyu / Kim Won-ho (first round)

Finals

Top half

Section 1

Section 2

Bottom half

Section 3

Section 4

Women's doubles

Seeds

 Nami Matsuyama / Chiharu Shida (second round)
 Jeong Na-eun / Kim Hye-jeong (withdrew)
 Kim So-yeong / Kong Hee-yong (second round)
 Jongkolphan Kititharakul / Rawinda Prajongjai (semi-finals)
 Mayu Matsumoto / Wakana Nagahara (withdrew)
 Pearly Tan / Thinaah Muralitharan (semi-finals)
 Apriyani Rahayu / Siti Fadia Silva Ramadhanti (quarter-finals)
 Gabriela Stoeva / Stefani Stoeva (withdrew)

Finals

Top half

Section 1

Section 2

Bottom half

Section 3

Section 4

Mixed doubles

Seeds

 Yuta Watanabe / Arisa Higashino (withdrew)
 Tan Kian Meng / Lai Pei Jing (second round)
 Thom Gicquel / Delphine Delrue (semi-finals)
 Mark Lamsfuß / Isabel Lohau (first round)
 Seo Seung-jae / Chae Yoo-jung (first round)
 Goh Soon Huat / Shevon Jemie Lai (quarter-finals)
 Rinov Rivaldy / Pitha Haningtyas Mentari (second round)
 Robin Tabeling / Selena Piek (first round)

Finals

Top half

Section 1

Section 2

Bottom half

Section 3

Section 4

References

External links
 Tournament Link

Indonesian Masters (badminton)
Indonesia Masters
Indonesia Masters
Indonesia Masters